"I've Had It" is a song written by Carl Bonura and Ray Ceroni and performed by The Bell Notes.

Chart performance
"I've Had It" reached #6 on the U.S. pop chart and #19 on the U.S. R&B chart in 1959.
The song was ranked #62 on Billboard's Year-End Hot 100 singles of 1959.

Other charting versions
Lonnie Mack released a version of the song which reached #128 on the U.S. pop chart in 1964.
Fanny released a version of the song which reached #79 on the U.S. pop chart in 1974.

Other versions
The Starlets released a version of the song as a single in 1965, but it did not chart.
Alex Chilton released a version of the song on his 1979 album Like Flies on Sherbert.
Louise Goffin released a version of the song as a single in 1981, but it did not chart.
Gene Summers released a version of the song on his 1993 compilation album School of Rock 'n Roll.
The Slades released a version of the song on the 1998 various artist album The Domino Records Story.
The Mojo Men released a version of the song on their 2008 compilation album Not Too Old to Start Cryin': The Lost 1966 Masters.
Fabulous Poodles released a version of the song on their 2018 compilation album Mirror Stars: The Complete Pye Recordings 1976-1980.

References

1958 songs
1958 singles
1964 singles
1965 singles
1974 singles
1981 singles
Fraternity Records singles
Casablanca Records singles
Asylum Records singles